Cathy Ross  (born 19 November 1967) is a Canadian soccer player who played as a defender for the Canada women's national soccer team. She was part of the team at the 1995 FIFA Women's World Cup.

Honours 
 2021: Canada Soccer Hall of Fame

References

External links
 
 / Canada Soccer Hall of Fame

1967 births
Living people
Canadian women's soccer players
Canada women's international soccer players
Place of birth missing (living people)
1995 FIFA Women's World Cup players
Women's association football defenders